The 2010–11 Basketball League Belgium Division I, for sponsorship reasons named 2010–11 Ethias League, was the 83rd season of the Basketball League Belgium, the highest professional basketball league in Belgium. Spirou Charleroi won the 2011 national title.

Regular season

|}

Playoffs

References

Basketball League Belgium Division I seasons
Belgian
Lea